Tavio Ayao Tobias Amorin (20 November 1958 – 29 July 1992) was a Togolese socialist politician. He led the Pan-African Socialist Party, the ideology of which was influenced by such figures as Marcus Garvey, Kwame Nkrumah and Cheikh Anta Diop.

Amorin was born in Lomé. He was a member of the High Council of the Republic, formed in 1991 as the transitional legislature, and eventually became President of political and human rights affairs. He was also Permanent Secretary of the Coordination of the democratic opposition in Togo (CODII in French).

Being an outspoken opponent to President Gnassingbe Eyadema's dictatorial regime, Amorin was shot in the streets of Lomé by two unidentified men believed to be security force agents on July 23, 1992. First taken to a hospital in town, he was then evacuated in a critical state to a Paris hospital. He died in Paris a few days later on July 29. He was 33 years old.

Early life and career 
Born November 20, 1958, in Lomé, Tavio Ayao Tobias Amorin was educated at the Catholic School of Koketime primary and secondary at the College Saint - Joseph in Lomé, sanctioned by a science graduate in 1977. Left for France, he obtained a DEUG in Sciences before moving on to the computer. He specialized in industrial systems at the University of Orsay.

After having been Consultant in organization of business in France for a few years, Tavio Amorin moved to Ivory Coast. It is through general amnesty in 1991 obtained by the people and the street the young leader returned to Togo to take part in the political life of democratic renewal. He launched into political battle by setting up the Pan-African Socialist (PSP) party with other adventurous youth: Jean - Claude Edoh Ayanou, me Wakilou Maurice Gligli, Francis Agbagli and becomes by his enthusiasm and originality, the attraction of the National Conference of July–August 1991 to the Fazao room in Lomé.

Political commitment 
Young and authentic patriotic, keen on politics, Marxist school, Tavio Amorin was underestimated by the old political hacks that made him noticed his lack of experience in the Togolese political microcosm. So that poverty is not a flaw or a fatality for many of his compatriots, the leader of the PSP advocated proactive correction of structural imbalances. For all citizens, he dreamt of equal opportunities to the culture and jobs. Tavio Amorin wanted to invent a new future. He had exceptional moral and intellectual qualities that predispose it to overcome his ideas.

Courageous and far-sighted, Tavio Amorin wanted to reduce the enslavement of the people. By helping the Togolese to regain their dignity. The first national Secretary of the party socialist PanAfrican much bothered supporters of the established order. He didn't make the new with the old corrupt politicos. Bold and perilous adventure that will cost him life. On Thursday, July 23, 1992, at Tokoin - Gbonvie, a district of Lomé, capital Togo, he was assaulted by Togolese Police and succumbed to his injuries in a Paris hospital on July 29, 1992. Pan-Africanist, Tavio Amorin was favourable to the creation of the United States of Africa.

Fighter supreme, thirsty for democracy, Tavio Amorin was able to quench his thirst for freedom. August 20, 1992, he was buried in the cemetery of the beach in Lomé. Thirteen years after this sordid murder, despite left clues about the place of the package by the attackers, they were never worried. No further action is given until then to the complaint filed by the bereaved family to the courts.

References

1958 births
1992 deaths
Assassinated Togolese politicians
Deaths by firearm in Togo
Togolese democracy activists
People murdered in Togo
Pan-African Socialist Party politicians